Ernest Barnes (born 20 April 1937) is a New Zealand field hockey player. He competed in the men's tournament at the 1964 Summer Olympics.

References

External links
 

1937 births
Living people
New Zealand male field hockey players
Olympic field hockey players of New Zealand
Field hockey players at the 1964 Summer Olympics
Sportspeople from Christchurch